Lonely Road may refer to:

 Lonely Road (The Red Jumpsuit Apparatus album), or the title song
 Lonely Road (Denny Laine album), or the title song
 "Lonely Road", a song by Paul McCartney from Driving Rain
 The Lonely Road, album by jazz guitarist David Becker
 The Lonely Road (1923 film), an American drama
 Lonely Road (novel), a novel by Nevil Shute
 Lonely Road (film), a 1936 British drama based on Shute's novel
 Lonely Road Books, an American small-press publisher